Pierre Fairbank (born 27 July 1971) is a Paralympian athlete from France competing mainly in category T53 sprint events.

Fairbank first competed in the Paralympics in 2000 in Sydney where he won a gold in the T53 200m, a silver in the T53 400m and a bronze in the T53 800m, he also competed in the T54 Marathon. Four years later in Athens he again competed in the 200m, 400m and 800m but was unable to win a medal in these, however he did help the French team to a silver in the T53-54 4 × 400 m and a bronze in the T53-54 4 × 100 m. In 2008 in Beijing he again missed out in the individual events but again helped the French team to a bronze in the T53-54 4 × 400 m. In London 2012, he won no medals, though he did qualify for the final of the 800m, finishing 7th.

Notes

External links
 
 

1971 births
Paralympic athletes of France
French male wheelchair racers
Athletes (track and field) at the 2000 Summer Paralympics
Athletes (track and field) at the 2004 Summer Paralympics
Athletes (track and field) at the 2008 Summer Paralympics
Athletes (track and field) at the 2012 Summer Paralympics
Athletes (track and field) at the 2016 Summer Paralympics
Paralympic gold medalists for France
Paralympic silver medalists for France
Paralympic bronze medalists for France
Living people
Medalists at the 2000 Summer Paralympics
Medalists at the 2004 Summer Paralympics
Medalists at the 2008 Summer Paralympics
Medalists at the 2016 Summer Paralympics
People from Nouméa
Paralympic medalists in athletics (track and field)
Medalists at the World Para Athletics European Championships
Athletes (track and field) at the 2020 Summer Paralympics
20th-century French people
21st-century French people